Notis Mavroudis (16 July 1945 – 3 January 2023) was a Greek composer, songwriter, guitarist, columnist and radio producer. He had been active in music creation, classical guitar performance and discography since 1964.

Biography 
Notis Mavroudis was born in Athens on 16 July 1945. He spent the first two years of his life in prison next to his mother, who was a political prisoner after the Greek Civil War. In 1958 he started classical guitar lessons at the National Conservatory of Athens under the tutelage of Dimitris Fampas and graduated in 1969 with honors.

In 1970 he settled in Italy, where he was assigned the classical guitar chair at the Scuola Civica di Milano, where he taught until 1975. In 1970 he also attended the Santiago de Compostella Academy in Spain with Jose Tomas. In 1975 he settled permanently in Athens and from that year he taught classical guitar at the National Conservatory. In 1975, 1977 and 1979 he gave recitals at the Esztergom Classical Guitar Festival in Hungary. In 1978 he took part in the International Festival of Political Song in East Berlin and the 11th World Youth Festival in Havana, Cuba.

As a composer and soloist he had performed in Greece, Italy, Finland, Switzerland, Germany, Hungary, Austria and Cuba. As a professor at the National Conservatory of Athens, he was the teacher of several popular Greek artists such as Manolis Androulidakis, Socrates Malamas, Panagiotis Margaris etc.

He is one of the most distinguished contemporary Greek composers of song and orchestral music, with the main instrument being the classical guitar. His discography is remarkable in volume and distinctions and his influence on contemporary Greek music is significant.

He was the founder and director of the Greek music magazine "TaR". Since 2006 and in collaboration with the guitarist-composer Kostas Grigoreas, he published its digital version, under the name 'TaR online music magazine.

Mavroudis died from a fall on 3 January 2023, at the age of 77.

References

External links 
 Interview to tetragono.gr (in Greek)
 Interview to kitharologio.gr (in Greek)
 Interview to ogdoo.gr (in Greek)
 
 

1945 births
2023 deaths 
Accidental deaths from falls 
Accidental deaths in Greece
20th-century composers
21st-century composers
20th-century Greek musicians
21st-century Greek musicians
20th-century male musicians
21st-century male musicians
20th-century guitarists
21st-century guitarists
Greek classical guitarists
Greek classical musicians
Greek songwriters
Male classical composers
Musicians from Athens